Sipsey Creek is a stream in the U.S. states of Alabama and Mississippi. It is a tributary to the Buttahatchee River.

Sipsey is a name derived from the Choctaw language meaning "poplar tree". Variant names are "Sipsey River", "Sipsie Fork", and "Sipsie River".

References

Rivers of Alabama
Rivers of Lamar County, Alabama
Rivers of Marion County, Alabama
Rivers of Mississippi
Rivers of Monroe County, Mississippi
Alabama placenames of Native American origin
Mississippi placenames of Native American origin